Bravig Imbs was an American novelist and poet as well as a broadcaster and newspaperman.

Biography
Bravig Imbs was born in 1904 in Milwaukee to Norwegian-American parents. A graduate of Dartmouth College, he worked as a newspaper reporter, and music critic and, according to some, a proofreader for the 'International Edition of the Chicago Tribune in Paris.

In Paris he befriended George Antheil, Pavel Tchelitchew, René Crevel, Georges Maratier, and later Gertrude Stein and Alice B. Toklas. 
 In 1931, his wife Valeska gave birth to a child, Jane Maria Louise, and Gertrude Stein ended their friendship because of her aversion to childbirth.«A great many people came to the tea [for Jane's christening] - in honor of the fête we set the old samovar going and served tea in glasses - Gertrude and Alice among the first. Gertrude brought a charming silver mug, and Alice, a bowl of honey. [...] Gertrude and Alice had no marked interest in children, rather an aversion to them, but they very courteously said all they were supposed to say under such circumstances and stayed quite a long while.» B. Imbs, Confessions of another young man, p. 288.

He wrote novels, poems and a memoir, and played the harpsichord.James R. Mellow, Charmed Circle: Gertrude Stein and Company, Henry Holt and Co., 2003, p. 323 He translated some poems by Georges Hugnet. He also co-wrote books with Bernard Fay and André Breton. He chronicled his life in Paris in the 1920s in his Confessions of Another Young Man, published in 1936.

In 1944, he worked as a radio announcer, under the pseudonym of 'Monsieur Bobby'. He worked for the US State Department as a radio announcer for the O.I.C. in France after the war. He died there in a jeep accident travelling on official business near Livron-sur-Drome, on May 29, 1946, and was interred in a US military cemetery in Draguignan, France.

BibliographyThe Professor's WifeEden—Exit this Way, and Other Poems (1926)Bernard Faÿ's Franklin: The Apostle of Modern Times (co-written with Bernard Fay; 1929)Confessions of Another Young Man (1936)Yves Tanguy (co-written with André Breton; 1946)The Wind was There'' (This poem by Bravig Imbs has been set to music for high voice and orchestra by composer Michael B. Matthews [1982]; and has also been set to music by Mark Winges as "Image and Motion: A Choral Symphony" [2001])

References

Dartmouth College alumni
American expatriates in France
20th-century American novelists
American male novelists
20th-century American memoirists
1946 deaths
1904 births
20th-century American poets
American male poets
20th-century American male writers
American male non-fiction writers